John Pizzarelli Meets the Beatles is a studio album of tributes to The Beatles performed by John Pizzarelli and his working trio of brother Martin Pizzarelli and pianist Ray Kennedy. The selections are all given a swinging dimension.

Track listing 
"Can't Buy Me Love"
"I've Just Seen a Face"
"Here Comes the Sun"
"Things We Said Today"
"You've Got to Hide Your Love Away"
"Eleanor Rigby"
"And I Love Her"
"When I'm Sixty-Four"
"Oh! Darling"
"Get Back"
"The Long and Winding Road"
"For No One"

Personnel
John Pizzarellivocals, guitar
Martin Pizzarellidouble-bass
Ray Kennedypiano
Gary Keller (saxophone)
Chuck Wilson (saxophone)
Kenny Berger (saxophone)
Scott Robinson (saxophone)
Ken Peplowski (clarinet)
Alan Raphtrombone
John Mosca (trombone)
Peter Gordon (French horn)
Sammy Figueroa (percussion)
Tony Tedesco (drums) 
+ The Orchestra : 
 Xin M. Zhao (violin), Belinda Whitney-Barratt (violin), Alfred V. Brown (viola), Kenneth Burward-Hoy (viola), Juliet Haffner (viola), Richard Sortomme (violin), Laura J. Seaton (violin), Lisa Matricardi (violin), Laura S. Oatts (violin), Joel Pitchon (violin), Andrea Ingrid Schultz (violin), Maxine L. Roach (viola), Mitsue Takayama (viola), Joseph Bongiorno (bass), Melissa Meell (cello), John Miller (bass), Douglas W. Romoff (bass), Stacey G. Shames (harp), Jesse Levy (cello), Jeanne M. LeBlanc (cello), Leslie J. Tomkins (viola), Liuh-Wen Ting (viola), Stephanie L. Cummins (cello), Adam Grabois (cello), Chungsun Kim (cello), Elizabeth Lim-Dutton (violin), Katherine Naomi Katz (violin), Rick S. Dolan (violin), Avril Brown (violin), Max Ellen (violin), Barry Finclair (violin), Evan Johnson (violin), Sanford W. Allen (violin), Martin Agee (violin), Harry Allen (tenor saxophone), Karen Karlsrud (violin), Don Sebesky (flute), Don Sebesky (strings), Don Sebesky (accordion), Andy Fusco (alto saxophone)

References

Personnel : https://www.prestomusic.com/jazz/products/8289050--john-pizzarelli-meets-the-beatles

1998 albums
John Pizzarelli albums
Albums arranged by Don Sebesky
The Beatles tribute albums
RCA Records albums